Kimberley is a village and civil parish in the South Norfolk district, in the county of Norfolk, England, situated about  north-west of Wymondham, around the crossroads of the B1108 and B1135. The parish absorbed the parish of Carleton Forehoe on the 1 April 1935.

The villages name means 'Cyneburg's wood/clearing', a feminine personal name.

Kimberley is served by rail, as the Kimberley Park railway station is on the Mid-Norfolk Railway, which goes between Dereham and Wymondham.

The River Tiffey flows through the village.

Kimberley is home to Kimberley Hall, a house whose grounds were designed by Capability Brown.

The Wodehouse family had owned land in Kimberley since the 1370s, and in c. 1400 John Wodehouse built Wodehouse Tower at the site of the later  Kimberley Hall. John's son John Wodehouse Esq. distinguished himself in the Battle of Agincourt and was granted large estates by Henry V as a reward.
Earl of Kimberley is a title in the Peerage of the United Kingdom, created for John Wodehouse, 3rd Baron Wodehouse in 1866. The present holder of the title is John Wodehouse, 5th Earl of Kimberley.

Notable people
Ernest Raikes (1863–1931), cricketer
John Jenkins (composer) (1592–1678), English composer

Notes 

 http://kepn.nottingham.ac.uk/map/place/Norfolk/Kimberley

External links
Parish Council Website

 
Villages in Norfolk
Civil parishes in Norfolk
South Norfolk